Easy Now may refer to:

 Easy Now (album), a 2002 album by Jeb Loy Nichols
 "Easy Now" (song), a 1970 song by Eric Clapton